The 2004 Buffalo Bills season was their 45th in the National Football League. The team improved upon their previous season's output of 6–10, finishing 9–7. However, this was the fifth straight season in which the team missed the playoffs.

Buffalo needed a win in the final game of the season against the Pittsburgh Steelers to qualify for the playoffs. However, despite the Steelers playing their third-stringers (which, notably, included Willie Parker, who would have his breakout performance in the game), Buffalo lost and subsequently missed the playoffs. It was the only winning season that Buffalo had in the 2000s (2000–2009) and would be the Bills' last winning season until 2014.

According to Football Outsiders, who has tracked every play in the NFL since the early 1990s, the 2004 Bills were statistically the best NFL team (in their record-keeping history) to have failed to qualify for the playoffs.

The Bills set an NFL record by returning six kickoffs for touchdowns in 2004.

Their match with the Miami Dolphins in Week 6 is the only time in the NFL since 1968 that the last two winless teams have met each other.

As of 2023, the only remaining active members of the 2004 Buffalo Bills are offensive lineman Jason Peters, wide receiver Jonathan Smith, and offensive lineman Lawrence Smith, although Jonathan Smith is a free agent who hasn't played an NFL game in 16 years, and Lawrence Smith hasn't played an NFL game in 18 years.

Offseason

Free Agency 
The Bills failed to re-sign guard Ruben Brown and cornerback Antoine Winfield Sr. Both would end up signing with NFC North teams, with Brown signing with the Chicago Bears and Winfield signing with the Minnesota Vikings.

To replace the departed players, the Bills signed former Chicago Bears guard Chris Villarrial and former Philadelphia Eagles cornerback Troy Vincent.

NFL Draft 

The Bills drafted future starters Lee Evans from Wisconsin and J. P. Losman from Tulane in the first round of the 2004 Draft. Buffalo also signed undrafted tight end Jason Peters from Arkansas and converted him into a Pro Bowl offensive tackle. Buffalo traded their 2004 second round pick and 2005 first round pick to move into position to draft Losman.

Roster

Schedule

Game summaries

Week 1

Standings

References 

Buffalo Bills seasons
Buffalo Bills
Buff